David Cedric Yannick Evina-Si (born 16 November 1991) is a Cameroonian professional footballer who plays as a defender or midfielder.

Club career

Arsenal
As a nine-year-old playing district football in Barnet, Evina was invited by Liam Brady's scouting team for a trial. He then signed up and made his way up through the club's youth teams. He signed professional terms with the club in August 2009 and then followed this up with captaining the club's 2009–10 FA Youth Cup side, as well being a key part of the FA Premier Academy League winning team. He also played 11 times for the Reserves.

On 5 October 2010, he joined Oldham Athletic on loan until 4 January 2011. He made his Football League debut on 9 October 2010 in a League One match against Brentford. He scored his first ever professional goal against Rochdale on 27 November 2010.

Oldham Athletic
On 28 January 2011, Evina was signed on a free transfer by Paul Dickov after being released from Arsenal and impressing on his loan. Evina's first goal after signing came in a 4–0 win against Hartlepool United with a strike in the top right hand corner. Evina went on to make a further 14 appearances for Oldham, predominantly occupying the left-back spot and occasionally left-wing. His impressive performances during the season earned Evina Oldham's Young Player of the Year award. At the end of the 2010–11 season he was offered a new contract by Oldham. On 9 June it was confirmed by the club that Evina had rejected a new contract due to personal reasons. Evina stated in an interview with the club that "Manchester is a long way from home and I decided I wanted to be closer to my family", and went on to state it was nothing to do with the club or the monetary contract.

Charlton Athletic
Evina signed a two-year contract at Charlton Athletic in June 2011.
He found first team opportunities limited at Charlton in the 2011–12 season and made only one start for the club. Following an injury to regular left-back Rhoys Wiggins against Crystal Palace at the start of the 2012–13 season, Evina was subsequently handed a run of games in the side. However, he too picked up an injury which left him out of the side for almost two months. With Wiggins still sidelined, Evina returned to the fold and impressed the fans with some solid performances. On 19 July 2013, Evina signed a new one-year deal. On 22 May 2014, he was released from Charlton Athletic.

Doncaster Rovers
Evina signed for Doncaster Rovers on 30 July 2014 on a two-year contract.

On 12 December 2015, Evina signed a new two and a half-year contract which will see him remain at Keepmoat Stadium until the summer of 2018.

On 30 June 2017, Evina joined League Two side Crawley Town on a season-long loan.

Notts County
On 14 September 2018, Evina signed for Notts County.

He was released by Notts County at the end of the 2018–19 season.

Romford 
On 15 January 2020, Evina signed for Romford. However, after a couple of training sessions with Romford in January, he decided it wasn’t for him and extended his hiatus to work on projects outside of football.

International career
Evina is eligible to play for three countries, Cameroon, where he was born, France, where he grew up and England, where he has lived for several years. He was named in the provisional squad for France's Under-20 team for the 2011 Toulon Tournament, however he did not make the final cut and was not chosen for the final squad.

Career statistics

Honours
Oldham Athletic Young Player of the Year Award: 2011

References

External links

Arsenal profile

1991 births
Living people
Cameroonian footballers
Association football defenders
Arsenal F.C. players
Oldham Athletic A.F.C. players
Charlton Athletic F.C. players
Doncaster Rovers F.C. players
Crawley Town F.C. players
Notts County F.C. players
English Football League players
Place of birth missing (living people)
Romford F.C. players